Sami Chouchi (born 22 March 1993) is a Belgian judoka. He competes in the -81 kg weight category and won a silver medal in the 2018 European Judo Championships.

He won one of the bronze medals in his event at the 2022 Judo Grand Slam Paris held in Paris, France.

References

External links

 
 
 

1993 births
Belgian male judoka
Living people
Sportspeople from Brussels
European Games competitors for Belgium
Judoka at the 2015 European Games
Judoka at the 2019 European Games
21st-century Belgian people